Henry Burton Buckley, 1st Baron Wrenbury, PC (15 September 1845 – 27 October 1935), was a British barrister and judge.

Buckley was the fourth son of Reverend John Wall Buckley and his wife Elizabeth Burton, daughter of Thomas Burton; his elder sister Arabella was a writer and science educator. He was educated at Merchant Taylors' School and at Christ's College, Cambridge. He was Tancred law student from 1866 to 1872.

Buckley was called to the bar at Lincoln's Inn in 1869, and became a Queen's Counsel in 1886. He was a member of the Bar Committee and of the Bar Council from 1882 to 1898. In January 1900 he was appointed a judge of the High Court of Justice of England and Wales, and he received the customary knighthood from Queen Victoria at Windsor Castle on 3 March 1900. He became a Lord Justice of Appeal and was admitted to the Privy Council in 1906, and on his retirement in 1915 he was raised to the peerage as Baron Wrenbury, of Old Castle in the County of East Sussex.

In May 1901 he was elected an Honorary Fellow of Christ's College, Cambridge.

Lord Wrenbury married Bertha Margaretta Jones (1866–1960), daughter of Charles Edward Jones, in 1887. They had four sons and four daughters. He died at his home in Melbury Road, London, in October 1935, aged 90, and was cremated at Golders Green Crematorium. He was succeeded in the barony by his eldest son Bryan Burton Buckley, 2nd Baron Wrenbury. His younger son Sir Denys Burton Buckley also became a judge of the High Court of Justice of England and Wales and a Lord Justice of Appeal.

Arms

See also
Mr Justice Buckley Company law (Vanity Fair 1900)
Daimler Co Ltd v Continental Tyre and Rubber Co (Great Britain) Ltd [1915] 1 KB 893
Wrenbury Committee (27 February 1918)

References

Kidd, Charles, Williamson, David (editors). Debrett's Peerage and Baronetage (1990 edition). New York: St Martin's Press, 1990.
Legg, L. G. Wickham (editor). The Dictionary of National Biography: 1931-1940. Oxford University Press, 1949.

1845 births
1935 deaths
People educated at Merchant Taylors' School, Northwood
Alumni of Christ's College, Cambridge
Barons in the Peerage of the United Kingdom
Members of Lincoln's Inn
Members of the Privy Council of the United Kingdom
Members of the Judicial Committee of the Privy Council
Knights Bachelor
Chancery Division judges
Barons created by George V